Star Racer is a reality-genre TV show which originally aired on Discovery Channel Canada in 2006. It has been airing from October 2008 on Discovery's HD Theater, partly filmed from Circuit Mont-Tremblant. Star Racer chronicles the discovery and episode-by-episode elimination of some of the top amateur drivers in Canada over a period of 8 weeks. Racers participate in weekly racing events on an odyssey to prove themselves as the top talent. Host Yannick Bisson sets the stakes, and is the liaison between the drivers, the judges, and the audience. Eight racers from the world of Kart racing and eight drivers from other racing disciplines vie for the title of "Star Racer" and a career-making prize. The prize is a ride in the Formula Mazda Championship Racing Series where they will test their skills against professional racers.

Cast
Host:
Yannick Bisson

The Judges:
former F1 and Indycar driver and commentator Derek Daly 
former Champcar/CART driver Canadian Paul Tracy 
Champcar and DTM Driver Katherine Legge
Jim Russell Chief Instructor Philippe Letourneau
Performance Coach Dr. Jacques Dallaire

The Contestants: 
Adam Boutaleb
Chris Green
Stefany Malanka
Devin Cunningham - Winner
Lorenzo Mandarino - Finalist
Ed Hunt
Kyle Herder
Philippe Gelinas
Rahul Dua
Pearce Herder
Kristina Allinson
Blake Choquer
Robin Ng
Jenn Carlson
Matt Champagne
Darrel Vallie
PJ Gronke
Jenn Carlson
Rob Oakman
Jennifer Rempel

References

External links
 
 Discovery HD, Star Racer

2000s Canadian reality television series
Discovery Channel (Canada) original programming